Maja Ćirić (born 7 November 1989) is a Serbian athlete. She competed in the women's 400 metres at the 2018 IAAF World Indoor Championships.

References

External links

1989 births
Living people
Serbian female sprinters
Place of birth missing (living people)